Sturisoma tenuirostre is a species of armored catfish endemic to Venezuela where it occurs in the Meta River basin.  This species grows to a length of  SL.

References
 

Sturisoma
Fish of Venezuela
Endemic fauna of Venezuela
Fish described in 1910